Àlex Corretja was the defending champion, but did not participate this year.

Alberto Berasategui won the tournament, beating Thomas Muster in the final, 3–6, 6–1, 6–3.

Seeds

Draw

Finals

Top half

Bottom half

External links
 Main draw

Portugal Open
1998 ATP Tour
Estoril Open